Pulum Golam Sarwar Secondary School is a secondary school in Shalikha Upazila, Magura, Bangladesh. It was established in 1957 by Khondokar Abdul Motaleb (master saheb).

References

External links
 https://www.panoramio.com/photo/43882836

Educational institutions established in 1957
High schools in Bangladesh
1957 establishments in Pakistan